Western Reef (Mandarin ) is a shoal in the South China Sea, located  west of Gaven Reefs in the Spratly Islands.

References 

Reefs of the Spratly Islands